Archiv für das Studium der neueren Sprachen und Literaturen is the oldest modern philological journal, founded in 1846 by Ludwig Herrig and Heinrich Viehoff. The first two volumes were published by Julius Bädeker Verlag Elberfeld and Iserlohn and for the next 120 years by Georg Westermann Verlag Braunschweig (now Westermann Druck- und Verlagsgruppe). Since 1979, the journal is published by Erich Schmidt Verlag, Berlin. The articles, smaller contributions and reviews are written in German, English, and Romance languages. The current editor-in-chief is Christa Jansohn (University of Bamberg).

External links
 
 Journal page at publisher's site

Linguistics journals
Publications established in 1846
Multilingual journals
Biannual journals
Literary magazines published in Germany
Philology journals